The Chiwawa-class oilers were United States Navy T3 Tanker oilers of the T3-S-A1 design built during World War II at Bethlehem Sparrows Point Shipyard of Sparrows Point, Maryland. The class consisted of five ships, all of which survived the war.

All of the ships of the class initially were to be built for private companies, but the outset of World War II, the ships were transferred to the United States Maritime Commission and given new names. Later, when allocated to the U.S. Navy, they were renamed again.

Often the Chiwawa class is seen as part of the Kennebec class. In some cases the Kennebec class is divided into three classes, the Kennebec class (AO-36 to AO-40, AO-48), the Mattaponi class (AO-41 to AO-44, AO-47) and the Chiwawa class. The first two classes were of the T2 and T2-A designs whereas the Chiwawas were of the T3-S-A1 design, mainly differing in having only a 7,000 shp engine and a top speed of 15.3 knots.

The remaining two —  and  — were in and out of commission until late 1957. Chiwawa (now Lee A. Tregurtha) and Neshanic (now American Victory) are still in commercial service on the Great Lakes. Enoree Niobrara were both eventually scrapped while Escalante, then known as George MacDonald, sank in 1960.

Ships of the class

References

Auxiliary ship classes of the United States Navy
 
Ships built in Sparrows Point, Maryland
Auxiliary replenishment ship classes